There have been three baronetcies created for members of the Vernon family.

The Vernon baronetcy, of Hodnet, Salop was created in the Baronetage of England for Henry Vernon of Hodnet, Shropshire on 23 July 1660. It became extinct in 1725.

The Vernon baronetcy, of Hanbury Hall in Worcestershire was created in the Baronetage of the United Kingdom for Harry Foley Vernon on  23 July 1885. It became extinct in 1940.

The Vernon baronetcy, of Shotwick Park in Cheshire was created in the Baronetage of the United Kingdom for William Vernon on 24 January 1914. It is extant. Sir James Vernon, 5th Baronet, is a member of the Executive Committee of the Standing Council of the Baronetage.

Members of other branches of the Vernon family have been created Baron Vernon and Earl of Shipbrook.

Vernon baronets of Hodnet, Salop. (1660) 
Sir Henry Vernon, 1st Baronet  (1605–1676), MP for Shropshire 1660 and West Looe 1661–1676
Sir Thomas Vernon, 2nd Baronet  (died 1683)
Sir Richard Vernon, 3rd Baronet (1678–1725). Diplomat.

Vernon baronets, of Hanbury Hall (1885)
Sir Harry Vernon, 1st Baronet (1834–1920), MP for East Worcestershire 1861–1868
Captain Sir Bowater George Hamilton Vernon, 2nd Baronet (1865–1940)

Vernon baronets of Shotwick Park, Cheshire (1914)
Sir William Vernon, 1st Baronet  (1835–1919)
Sir John Herbert Vernon, 2nd Baronet  (1858–1933)
Sir William Norman Herbert Vernon, 3rd Baronet  (1890–1967)
Sir Nigel John Douglas Vernon, 4th Baronet (1924–2007)
Sir James Vernon, 5th Baronet (born 1949)

References

Extinct baronetcies in the Baronetage of England
Baronetcies in the Baronetage of the United Kingdom
Extinct baronetcies in the Baronetage of the United Kingdom